Ribonuclease IX (poly(U)- and poly(C)-specific endoribonuclease) is an enzyme. This enzyme catalyses the following chemical reaction

 Endonucleolytic cleavage of poly(U) or poly(C) to fragments terminated by 3'-hydroxy and 5'-phosphate groups

This enzyme acts on poly(U) and poly(C).

References

External links 

EC 3.1.26